Mam Bunheng (born 13 April 1949) is a Cambodian politician currently serving as the Minister of Health since 2008. Bunheng has been prominent in Cambodia's response to the COVID-19 pandemic.

References

1949 births
Living people
Cambodian physicians
People from Takéo province
Members of the National Assembly (Cambodia)
Government ministers of Cambodia
COVID-19 pandemic in Cambodia